

Year 1550 (MDL) was a common year starting on Wednesday (link will display the full calendar) of the Julian calendar.

Events 
 January–June 
 January 6 – Spanish Captain Hernando de Santana founds the city of Valledupar, in modern-day Colombia.
 February 8 – Pope Julius III succeeds Pope Paul III as the 221st pope.
 March 12 – Arauco War: Battle of Penco – Several hundred Spanish and indigenous troops under the command of Pedro de Valdivia defeat an army of 60,000 Mapuche in modern-day Chile.  
March 12 – Acapulco is founded by 30 families sent from Mexico City
March 24 – "Rough Wooing": England and France sign the Treaty of Boulogne, by which England withdraws from Boulogne in France and returns territorial gains in Scotland.
 March 29 – Sherborne School in England is refounded by King Edward VI.
 April 16 – The Valladolid debate on the rights and treatment of indigenous peoples of the Americas by their Spanish conquerors opens at the Colegio de San Gregorio in Valladolid, Castile.
 June 12 – The city of Helsinki, Finland (belonging to Sweden at this time) is founded by King Gustav I of Sweden.

 July–December 
 July (at least) – John Dee finishes his studies at the Old University of Leuven.
 July 7 – Chocolate is introduced to Europe.
 July 21 – The Society of Jesus (Jesuits) is approved by Pope Julius III.
 October 2 – Battle of Sauðafell in Iceland: Daði Guðmundsson of Snóksdalur defeats the forces of Catholic Bishop Jón Arason who is captured and executed, resulting in Iceland becoming fully Protestant.

 Date unknown 
 Altan Khan crosses the Great Wall of China and besieges Beijing, burning the suburbs.
 The summit level canal between the Alster and the Trave in Germany ceases to be navigable.
 The first grammatical description of the French language is published by Louis Maigret.
 The first book in Slovene, Catechismus, written by Protestant reformer Primož Trubar, is printed in Schwäbisch Hall, Holy Roman Empire.
 Nostradamus' first almanac is written.
 Approximate date – The discovery of silver at Zacatecas and Guanajuato in Mexico stimulates silver rushes.

Births 

 January 18 – Tsugaru Tamenobu, Japanese daimyō (d. 1607)
 February 1 – John Napier, Scottish mathematician (d. 1617)
 February 17 – Philip of Hohenlohe-Neuenstein, Dutch army commander (d. 1606)
 February 22 – Charles de Ligne, 2nd Prince of Arenberg (d. 1616)
 March 6 – Michelangelo Naccherino, Italian sculptor (d. 1622)
 March 8 – William Drury, English politician (d. 1590)
 April 5 – Andrés Pacheco, Spanish churchman and theologian (d. 1626)
 April 9 – Giulio Pace, Italian philosopher (d. 1635)
 April 12 – Edward de Vere, 17th Earl of Oxford, Lord Great Chamberlain of England (d. 1604)
 April 16 – Francis Anthony, English apothecary and physician (d. 1623)
 April 18 – Alessandro Pieroni, Italian painter (d. 1607)
 May 8 – John I, Count Palatine of Zweibrücken (d. 1604)
 May 25 – Camillus de Lellis, Italian saint and nurse (d. 1614)
 June 16 – Marie Eleonore of Cleves, Duchess consort of Prussia (1573–1608) (d. 1608)
 June 27 – King Charles IX of France (d. 1574)
 June 28 – Johannes van den Driesche, Flemish Protestant clergyman and scholar (d. 1616)
 July 3 – Jacobus Gallus, Slovenian composer (d. 1591)
 August 6 – Enrico Caetani, Italian Catholic cardinal (d. 1599)
 August 8 – Petrus Gudelinus, Belgian jurist (d. 1619)
 September 1 – Alonso Pérez de Guzmán, 7th Duke of Medina Sidonia, Spanish admiral (d. 1615)
 September 10 – Alonso de Guzmán El Bueno, 7th Duke of Medina Sidonia, commander of the Spanish Armada (d. 1615)
 September 17 – Pope Paul V (d. 1621)
 September 29 – Joachim Frederick of Brieg, Duke of Wołów (1586-1602) (d. 1602)
 September 30 – Michael Maestlin, German astronomer and mathematician (d. 1631)
 October 1 – Anne of Saint Bartholomew, Spanish Discalced Carmelite nun (d. 1626)
 October 4 – King Charles IX of Sweden (d. 1611)
 October 8 – Antonio Zapata y Cisneros, Spanish cardinal (d. 1635)
 October 25 – Ralph Sherwin, English Roman Catholic priest (martyred 1581)
 October 28 – Stanislaus Kostka, Polish saint (d. 1568)
 November 1 – Henry of Saxe-Lauenburg, Prince-Archbishop of Bremen, Prince-Bishop of Osnabruck and Paderborn (d. 1585)
 November 6 – Karin Månsdotter, Swedish queen (d. 1612)
 December 2 – Antonio Fernández de Córdoba y Cardona, Spanish diplomat (d. 1606)
 December 6 – Orazio Vecchi, Italian composer (d. 1605)
 December 21
 Aegidius Hunnius, German theologian (d. 1603)
 Man Singh I, Mughal noble (d. 1614)
 December 22 – Cesare Cremonini, Italian philosopher (d. 1631)
 December 28 – Vicente Espinel, Spanish writer (d. 1624)
 December 29 – García de Silva Figueroa, Spanish diplomat and traveller (d. 1624)
 December 31 – Henry I, Duke of Guise (d. 1588)
 date unknown
 Jacob ben Isaac Ashkenazi, Polish Jewish author (d. 1625)
 Willem Barentsz, Dutch navigator and explorer (d. 1597)
 Anselmus de Boodt, Belgian mineralogist and physician (d. 1632)
 Matthijs Bril, Flemish painter (d. 1583)
 Helena Antonia, Austrian court dwarf  (d. 1595)
 Sarsa Dengel, Emperor of Ethiopia (d. 1597)
 Hugh O'Neill, Earl of Tyrone, Irish rebel (d. 1616)
 probable
 Robert Balfour, Scottish philosopher (d. 1625)
 Henry Barrowe, English Puritan and Separatist (d. 1593)
 Emilio de' Cavalieri, Italian composer (d. 1602)
 Cornelis Corneliszoon, Dutch inventor of the sawmill (d. c. 1600)
 Philip Henslowe, English theatrical entrepreneur (d. 1616)
 Brianda Pereira, Azorean Portuguese heroine (d. 1620)

Deaths 

 January 12 – Andrea Alciato, Italian jurist and writer (b. 1492)
 January 22 – Jamsheed Quli Qutb Shah, second ruler of Golconda
 January 28 – Magnus III of Mecklenburg-Schwerin, Lutheran administrator of the Prince-Bishopric of Schwerin (b. 1509)
 February 22 – Francesco III Gonzaga, Duke of Mantua (b. 1533)
 March 7 – William IV, Duke of Bavaria (b. 1493)
 March 8 – John of God, Spanish friar and saint (b. 1495)
 April 12 – Claude, Duke of Guise, French soldier (b. 1496)
 April 13 – Innocenzo Cybo, Italian Catholic cardinal (b. 1491)
 April 30 – King Tabinshwehti of Burma (b. 1516)
 May 18 – Jean, Cardinal of Lorraine, French churchman (b. 1498)
 May 20 – Ashikaga Yoshiharu, Japanese shōgun (b. 1511)
 June 13 – Veronica Gambara, Italian poet (b. 1485)
 July 19 (probable date) – Jacopo Bonfadio, Italian historian, executed (b. c. 1508)
 July 22 – Jorge de Lencastre, Duke of Coimbra (b. 1481)
 July 30 – Thomas Wriothesley, 1st Earl of Southampton, English politician (b. 1505)
 August 18 – Antonio Ferramolino, Italian architect and military engineer
 October 20 – Ferdinand, Duke of Calabria (b. 1488)
 October 23 – Tiedemann Giese, Polish Catholic bishop (b. 1480)
 October 24 – Louis of Valois, French prince (b. 1549)
 October 26 – Samuel Maciejowski, Polish Catholic bishop (b. 1499)
 November 6 – Ulrich, Duke of Württemberg (b. 1487)
 November 7 – Jón Arason, last Catholic bishop of Iceland (b. 1484)
 December 6 – Pieter Coecke van Aelst, Flemish painter (b. 1502)
 December 8 – Gian Giorgio Trissino, Italian humanist, poet, dramatist and diplomat (b. 1478)
 December 29 – Bhuvanaikabahu VII, King of Kotte (b. 1468)
 date unknown – Aq Kubek of Astrakhan, ruler of Astrakhan Khanate

References